Kuzunqışlaq (also, Kuzunkyshlak and Kuzunkyshlakh) is a village and municipality in the Qusar Rayon of Azerbaijan.  It has a population of 1,052.

References 

Populated places in Qusar District